Elections took place in Calabarzon for seats in the House of Representatives of the Philippines on May 9, 2022.

The candidate with the most votes will win that district's seat for the 19th Congress of the Philippines.

Summary

Antipolo

1st District

Incumbent First District Representative Roberto "Robbie" Puno will run for second term. He will be challenged by Salvador "Raldy" Abaño and Javez "Jebs" Tibio, both running independently.

2nd District

The seat is currently vacant upon the death of former representative Resureccion Acop. Acop's husband former representative Romeo Acop is running for the position unopposed.

Batangas

1st District

Eileen Ermita-Buhain is term-limited. Her husband, former Philippine Sports Commission and Games and Amusement Board Chairman Eric Buhain is her party's nominee. His opponents are his sister-in-law Liza Ermita, Gerry Manalo and Luisito Ruiz. Eduard Rillo withdrew from the congressional race.

2nd District

Incumbent  Raneo Abu is term limited. His daughter, Reina Abu is his party's nominee. Her opponents are former Presidential Anti-graft Commission Commissioner Nicasio Conti and Jinky Luistro, Municipal Administrator of Mabini and wife of incumbent Mabini Mayor Noel "Bitrics" Luistro.

3rd District

IIncumbent Ma. Theresa "Maitet" Collantes is running for her third and final term. Her opponents are Nestor Burgos and incumbent Talisay Mayor Gerry Natanauan. Irich John Bolinas was substituted by incumbent Tanauan City Mayor Mary Angeline Halili.

4th District 

Incumbent Lianda Bolilia is running for her third and final term. Her opponent is former Taysan Mayor Victor Portugal, Jr. This will serve as a rematch of the 2016 congressional elections for both Bolilia and Portugal.

5th District (Batangas City) 

Incumbent Marvey Mariño is running for his third and final term. His opponent is Calito Bisa.

6th District (Lipa City) 

Incumbent Vilma Santos-Recto, who was initially planning to run for a higher office, is retiring from politics. Her husband, incumbent Senator Ralph Recto is her party's nominee and is running unopposed.

Biñan

Marlyn Alonte-Naguiat is the incumbent. Her opponent is Mike Yatco.

Calamba

Incumbent Joaquin Chipeco, Jr. is term-limited. His son, incumbent Mayor Justin Marc Chipeco is his party's nominee. His opponents are incumbent Councilor Charisse Anne Hernandez and Emerson Panganiban.

Cavite

1st District (Northern Cavite)

Incumbent Francis Gerald Abaya is term-limited and is running for mayor of Kawit. His brother, former Kawit Vice Mayor Paul Abaya is his party's nominee. His opponent is incumbent Vice Governor Jolo Revilla.

2nd District (Bacoor)

Incumbent Strike Revilla is running for Mayor of Bacoor, switching places with his sister-in-law, incumbent mayor Lani Mercado-Revilla.

3rd District (Imus)

Incumbent Alex Advincula is term-limited and is running for Mayor of Imus. His son, incumbent councilor AJ Advincula is running in his place.

4th District (Dasmariñas)

Incumbent Elpidio Barzaga, Jr. is running for reelection.

5th District (CarSiGMA District)

Incumbent Dahlia Loyola is running for Mayor of Carmona, switching places with her husband, incumbent Mayor Roy Loyola.

6th District (General Trias)

Incumbent Luis Ferrer IV is term-limited and is running for Mayor of General Trias, switching places with his brother, incumbent Mayor Antonio Ferrer.

7th District (Central Cavite)

Incumbent Jesus Crispin Remulla is running for reelection.

8th District (Southwest Cavite)

Incumbent Abraham Tolentino is term-limited and is running for Mayor of Tagaytay, switching places with his wife, incumbent Mayor Agnes Tolentino. Mayor Tolentino was substituted by her daughter Aniela Tolentino to run for Congress. 
}

Laguna

1st District 
Incumbent Dan Fernandez is running in the newly-created Lone District of Santa Rosa. Former board member Dave Almarinez and incumbent board member Ann Matibag are the notable candidates for the redistricted seat.

2nd District 

Ruth Mariano-Hernandez is the incumbent. Her opponent is former PAGCOR Chief Efraim Genuino.

3rd District 

Incumbent Sol Aragones is term-limited and is running for governor. Incumbent San Pablo mayor Loreto Amante will run for the position. His opponents are actress and incumbent board member Angelica Jones, Maria Cristina Villamor and King Mediano.

4th District 

Incumbent Benjamin Agarao Jr. is term-limited and will run for Mayor of Santa Cruz. His daughter Jam, an incumbent board member, is his party's nominee. Her opponent is former Santa Maria mayor Antonio Carolino.

Quezon

1st District

Incumbent Wilfrido Mark Enverga is running for reelection.

2nd District

Incumbent David Suarez is running for reelection.

3rd District

Incumbent Aleta Suarez is running for reelection.

4th District

Incumbent Angelina Tan is term-limited and is running for governor. Her party nominated her son, Keith Micah "Atorni Mike" Tan.

Rizal

1st District

Incumbent Representative Jack Duavit will seek for his third and final term.

2nd District

Former board member and Clark International Airport Corporation President & CEO Emigdio Tanjuatco III won the elections.

3rd District

Former Metropolitan Manila Development Authority General Manager Jose Arturo "Jojo" Garcia Jr. won the elections. The new district comprises the municipality of San Mateo.

4th District

Incumbent Juan Fidel Nograles defeated his predecessor, former Rep. Isidro Rodriguez Jr.

Santa Rosa

Incumbent 1st district representative Dan Fernandez won the new seat for Santa Rosa, defeating former councilor Petronio "Boy" Factoriza Jr.

References 

2022 Philippine general election
Lower house elections in Calabarzon
May 2022 events in the Philippines